Bogdan Cristian Stoica (born January 28, 1990) is a Romanian professional kickboxer and boxer, and former wushu practitioner. He is currently signed to ONE Championship. Stoica is also one-time SUPERKOMBAT Cruiserweight Champion, one-time Enfusion Light Heavyweight and two-time wushu national champion. He was also ranked as a top-10 middleweight in the world for several years by LiverKick.com, CombatPress.com and Glory.

As of 16 January 2019, Stoica was ranked the #1 light-heavyweight in the world by Enfusion Live.

Bogdan is known to wear shorts with extra slits on his shorts for better movement. He is also known for his flying kicks, knee attacks and axe-kick, a kick that is characterized by a straightened leg descending onto an opponent like the blade of an axe.

Background
Stoica is the son of a former boxer.

He has been training in Bucharest, Romania for his entire career. Stoica first went to Respect Gym, which was run by Alin Panaite, where he trained with fellow kickboxers Andrei Stoica, Benjamin Adegbuyi, Claudiu Bădoi, Ciprian Șchiopu and Florin Lupu.

In 2018, he opened his own gym (Stoica Brothers Fight Academy), and since then he has been training there also under the guidance of the boxing coach Andrei Mircea.

Kickboxing career

Early career
Bogdan Stoica made his SUPERKOMBAT debut against the brother of Dževad Poturak, Dženan, with a knockout in an event which took place in Sibiu, Romania. In February 2011, he scored smashing first-round knockout over experienced Muay Thai fighter trained by Remy Bonjasky, Fred Sikking, which was the biggest win of his kickboxing career. This loss earned Sikking the second KO of his career in over 50 fights. The event took place in Sofia, Bulgaria.

Intercontinental champion
On May 21, Stoica won the WAKO-PRO Intercontinental -88.6 kg Championship (K-1 rules). He landed a right knee to the head of Pacôme Assi in the third. The Frenchman took a standing eight count and the bout was summarily called off by the referee.

Fastest knockout in the Local Kombat
At "Bodyguardul - Forţele Speciale", he won the fight via quick knockout, the referee pulling Stoica away from Đurđević at around the 8 second mark.

World champion
He won the vacant SUPERKOMBAT Cruiserweight Championship by defeating WBC Muay Thai champion Ivan Stanić. Stoica looked outstanding, dropping Stanić 3 times en route to winning the belt and landing some beautiful flying knees.  The Romanian even flew over the top rope and out of the ring with a flying knee attempt.  Stanić showed heart by coming forward the whole time but Stoica closed his eye and took over, winning a unanimous decision in completely overwhelming fashion.

Motorcycle injury
On July 18, 2012, Stoica was struck by a car coming out from the side. He tried to avoid contact by veering sharply away from the car and ended up slamming into the asphalt. The accident caused him a severe back injury. After a week or so, Stoica was out of the hospital. His full recovery could take up to six months. He resumed training in November 2012.

Return
He was set to make K-1 debut on his return to the ring in 2013. He instead made a successful comeback by knocking out Romano Romasco in round two at SUPERKOMBAT World Grand Prix I 2013 in Oradea, Romania on April 6.

Stoica will beat Iranian veteran and gold medalist at World Martial Arts Festival, Eisa Ramezani, by unanimous decision at SUPERKOMBAT New Heroes 4 in Dubai, UAE on May 31, 2013.

He defeated Marsan Yohan via TKO due to a cut in just 25 seconds at SUPERKOMBAT New Heroes 5 in Târgoviște, Romania on August 30, 2013.

He KOed Amir Zeyada in round one at SUPERKOMBAT World Grand Prix IV 2013 in Giurgiu, Romania on October 12.

He lost the SUPERKOMBAT Cruiserweight Championship against Igor Bugaenko when he lost by unanimous decision at the SUPERKOMBAT World Grand Prix 2013 Final in Galați, Romania on December 21.

Stoica lost to Lorenzo Javier Jorge at SUPERKOMBAT New Heroes 7 Ploiești, Romania on March 29, 2014.

It was announced during the Glory 15: Istanbul broadcast that Stoica would be one of eight fighters competing in the Glory 17: Los Angeles - Last Man Standing middleweight tournament in Inglewood, California, United States on June 21, 2014. Stoica was knocked out by Wayne Barrett in round three of their quarterfinal match when the American countered one of his patented flying knees with a vicious left hook.

On October 25, 2014, he made his return to the SUPERKOMBAT. For this match, Stoica faced Aristote Quitusisa at SUPERKOMBAT World Grand Prix 2014 Final Elimination in the season five quarter-finals match up. He lost the fight via unanimous decision.

Back on Track
Respect Gym's Bogdan Stoica met Alexandru Negrea in a reserve match for the Light Heavyweight Tournament on November 22, 2014 at SUPERKOMBAT World Grand Prix 2014 Final. Stoica won the fight via KO in the third round.

Stoica next faced Zinedine Hameur-Lain on March 7, 2015 at SUPERKOMBAT World Grand Prix I 2015. He won the match against Hameur-Lain in the first-round via KO.

He faced İbrahim Giydirir on 23 May 2015 at SUPERKOMBAT World Grand Prix II 2015. Stoica dominated his opponent, winning via unanimous decision.

Stoica stopped Horace Martin in second round on June 13, 2015 at SUPERKOMBAT Special Edition.

On August 1, 2015, at SUPERKOMBAT World Grand Prix IV 2015 Stoica and Fabio Kwasi were involved in a battle that was very close and ended in a split decision in favor of Bogdan Stoica.

In a fight of SUPERKOMBAT World Grand Prix 2015 Final Elimination at Gran Teatro Linear4Ciak, he won his sixth straight fight  with a unanimous decision over Patrick Veenstra.

Another injury
On October 18, 2015, Bogdan Stoica lost to Ibrahim El Bouni after being forced to withdraw due to knee injury at WFL "Unfinished Business" in Hoofddorp, Netherlands. The knee injury is expected to keep him out of action for about six weeks.

Enfusion World Title
He won the Enfusion -95 Kg World Title on 27 October 2018 in Oberhausen, Germany.

Stoica missed the entire 2019 due to injury. He also required hand surgery.

ONE Championship
In May 2020, he signed a contract with ONE Championship. After over two years away from the sport, Stoica was scheduled to fight the two-time ISKA Germany Champion Rinor Latifaj at Dynamite Fighting Show 10. Stoica won the fight by unanimous decision.

Stoica was scheduled to face John Granville at OSS Fighters 06 on July 16, 2021. He won the fight by a second-round technical knockout.

Stoica faced Beybulat Isaev at ONE Championship: NextGen on October 29, 2021. He lost the fight by unanimous decision.

Championships and accomplishments

Kickboxing
Dynamite Fighting Show  
2021 Comeback of the Year nomination
2021 Most Popular Fighter of the Year nomination
Enfusion
Enfusion Light Heavyweight Championship -95 kg/209 lb (One time, current) 
SUPERKOMBAT Fighting Championship
SUPERKOMBAT Cruiserweight Championship -92 kg/202.8 lb (One time)
Youngest fighter to win a SUPERKOMBAT championship (22 years, 105 days)
2011 Breakthrough Fighter of the Year 
First SUPERKOMBAT Cruiserweight Champion
Fastest Knockout in SUPERKOMBAT History (0:08)
World Association of Kickboxing Organizations
WAKO Pro Intercontinental Cruiserweight Championship -88.6 kg (K-1 rules) (One time)
Full Fight
Full Fight -82.0 kg Championship (One time)
World Kickboxing and Karate Union
WKU Cruiserweight Championship -90 kg (One time, current)

Wushu
Romanian National Wushu Championship
Romanian National Qingda Light Heavyweight Championship (One time)
Romanian National Qingda Cruiserweight Championship (One time)

Kickboxing record

|-
|-  style="background:#;"
| 2023-05-20 || ||align=left| To be  announced || Fight Clubbing 32 || Pescara, Italy || ||  ||
|-
! style=background:white colspan=9 |
|- 
|-  bgcolor="#CCFFCC"
| 2023-03-12 || Win ||align=left| Vladimir Toktasynov || Dynamite Fighting Show 18 || Timișoara, Romania || KO (flying knee) || 2 || 57-13
|-
|-  bgcolor="#CCFFCC"
| 2022-06-24 || Win ||align=left| Sam Tevette || Dynamite Fighting Show 15 || Buzău, Romania || Decision (unanimous) || 3 || 56–13  
|-
|-  bgcolor="#CCFFCC"
| 2022-05-06 || Win ||align=left| Badr Ferdaous || Dynamite Fighting Show 14 || Bucharest, Romania || TKO (three knockdowns) || 1 || 55-13
|-  bgcolor="#FFBBBB"
| 2021-10-29 || Loss ||align=left| Beybulat Isaev || ONE Championship: NextGen || Kallang, Singapore || Decision (unanimous) || 3 || 54–13  
|- 
|-  bgcolor="#CCFFCC"
| 2021-07-16 || Win ||align=left| John Granville || OSS Fighters 06 || Constanța, Romania || TKO (doctor stoppage) || 2 || 54-12 
|-  
|-  bgcolor="#CCFFCC"
| 2021-03-10 || Win ||align=left| Rinor Latifaj || Dynamite Fighting Show 10 || Bucharest, Romania || Decision (unanimous) || 3 || 53-12 
|-  
|-  bgcolor="#CCFFCC"
| 2018-10-27 || Win ||align=left| Levi Kuyken || Enfusion 73 ||  Oberhausen, Germany  || TKO (three knockdowns) || 3 || 52-12
|-
! style=background:white colspan=9 |
|-
|-  style="background:#fbb;"
| 2018-08-24 || Loss ||align=left| Hao Guanghua || GFC 5: Romania vs. China II || Mamaia, Romania || DQ (illegal knee strike)|| 3 || 51-12 
|-
|-  style="background:#cfc;"
| 2018-04-20 || Win ||align=left| Mantas Rimdeika || OSS Fighters 01 || Constanța, Romania || Decision (unanimous) || 3 || 51-11  
|-
|-  style="background:#fbb;"
| 2018-03-25 || Loss ||align=left| Ibrahim El Bouni || WFL: El Bouni vs. Stoica, Final 16 || Almere, Netherlands || Decision (unanimous) || 3 || 50-11 
|-
|-  style="background:#cfc;"
| 2017-10-16 || Win ||align=left| Fatih Karakuş || Colosseum Tournament 4 || Bucharest, Romania || KO (right low kick) || 1 || 50-10  
|-
|-  style="background:#cfc;"
| 2017-06-16 || Win ||align=left| Hao Guanghua || GFC 2: Romania vs. China || Timișoara, Romania || Decision (split) || 3 || 49-10  
|-
|-  style="background:#cfc;"
| 2017-05-06 || Win ||align=left| David Trallero || Mix Fight 31 || Valencia, Spain || Decision (unanimous) || 3 || 48-10  
|-
|-  style="background:#fbb;"
| 2016-10-01 || Loss ||align=left| Israel Adesanya || Glory of Heroes 5 || Zhengzhou, China || TKO (left body kick) || 2 || 47-10
|-
|-  style="background:#fbb;"
| 2016-07-02 || Loss ||align=left| Antonio Plazibat || Respect World Series 2 || London, England || TKO (leg injury) || 2 || 47-9
|-
|-  style="background:#cfc;"
| 2016-05-07 || Win ||align=left| James Phillips || Showdown Fight Night II || Mannheim, Germany || KO (right knee to the body) || 2 || 47-8
|-
! style=background:white colspan=9 |
|- 
|-  style="background:#cfc;"
| 2016-03-19 || Win ||align=left| Bojan Džepina || Respect World Series 1 || Madrid, Spain || TKO (doctor stoppage) || 1 || 46-8
|-
|-  style="background:#cfc;"
| 2015-12-12 || Win ||align=left| Damian Garcia || SUPERKOMBAT In The Cage || Turin, Italy || KO (right hook) || 3 || 45-8
|-  style="background:#fbb;"
| 2015-10-18 || Loss ||align=left| Ibrahim El Bouni || WFL "Unfinished Business" || Hoofddorp, Netherlands || TKO (knee ligament injury) || 1 || 44-8
|-  style="background:#cfc;"
| 2015-10-02 || Win ||align=left| Patrick Veenstra || SUPERKOMBAT World Grand Prix 2015 Final Elimination || Milan, Italy || Decision (unanimous) || 3 || 44-7
|-  style="background:#cfc;"
| 2015-08-01 || Win ||align=left| Fabio Kwasi || SUPERKOMBAT World Grand Prix IV 2015 || Mamaia, Romania || Decision (split) || 3 || 43-7
|-  style="background:#cfc;"
| 2015-06-13 || Win ||align=left| Horace Martin || SUPERKOMBAT Special Edition || Spreitenbach, Switzerland || TKO (referee stoppage) || 2 || 42-7
|-
! style=background:white colspan=9 |
|-  style="background:#cfc;"
| 2015-05-23 || Win ||align=left| İbrahim Giydirir || SUPERKOMBAT World Grand Prix II 2015 || Bucharest, Romania || Decision (unanimous) || 3 || 41-7
|-  style="background:#cfc;"
| 2015-03-07 || Win ||align=left| Zinedine Hameur-Lain || SUPERKOMBAT World Grand Prix I 2015 || Ploiești, Romania || KO (right hook) || 1 || 40-7
|-  style="background:#cfc;"
| 2014-11-22 ||Win ||align=left| Alexandru Negrea || SUPERKOMBAT World Grand Prix 2014 Final, Reserve Bout || Monza, Italy || KO (left uppercut) || 3 || 39-7
|-  style="background:#fbb;"
| 2014-10-25 || Loss ||align=left| Aristote Quitusisa || SUPERKOMBAT World Grand Prix 2014 Final Elimination, Quarter Finals || Geneva, Switzerland || Decision (majority) || 3 || 38-7
|-  style="background:#fbb;"
| 2014-06-21 || Loss ||align=left| Wayne Barrett || Glory 17: Los Angeles - Middleweight Last Man Standing Tournament, Quarter Finals || Inglewood, California, USA || KO (left hook) || 3 || 38-6
|-  style="background:#fbb;"
| 2014-03-29 || Loss ||align=left| Jorge Loren || SUPERKOMBAT New Heroes 7 || Ploiești, Romania || Decision (unanimous) || 3 || 38-5
|-  style="background:#fbb;"
| 2013-12-21 || Loss ||align=left| Igor Bugaenko || SUPERKOMBAT World Grand Prix 2013 Final || Galați, Romania || Decision (unanimous) || 3 || 38-4
|-
! style=background:white colspan=9 |
|-  style="background:#cfc;"
| 2013-10-12 || Win ||align=left| Amir Zeyada || SUPERKOMBAT World Grand Prix IV 2013 || Giurgiu, Romania || KO (left hook)|| 1 || 38-3
|-  style="background:#cfc;"
| 2013-08-30 || Win ||align=left| Yohan Marsan || | SUPERKOMBAT New Heroes 5 || Târgoviște, Romania || TKO (cut) || 1 || 37-3
|-  style="background:#cfc;"
| 2013-05-31 || Win ||align=left| Eisa Ramezani || SUPERKOMBAT New Heroes 4 || Dubai, UAE || Decision (unanimous) || 3 || 36-3
|-  style="background:#cfc;"
| 2013-04-06 || Win ||align=left| Romano Romasco || SUPERKOMBAT World Grand Prix I 2013 || Oradea, Romania || KO (right hook) || 2 || 35-3
|-  style="background:#cfc;"
| 2012-05-12 || Win ||align=left| Ivan Stanić || SUPERKOMBAT World Grand Prix II 2012 || Cluj-Napoca, Romania || Decision (unanimous) || 3 || 34-3
|-
! style=background:white colspan=9 |
|-  style="background:#cfc;"
| 2012-03-30 || Win ||align=left| Andi Đurđević || Local Kombat: Bodyguardul - Forţe Speciale || Târgu Jiu, Romania ||  KO (left high kick) || 1 || 33-3
|-  style="background:#cfc;"
| 2011-11-19 || Win ||align=left| Dawid Baziak || SUPERKOMBAT World Grand Prix 2011 Final || Darmstadt, Germany ||  TKO (doctor stoppage) || 3 || 32-3
|-  style="background:#cfc;"
| 2011-10-15 || Win ||align=left| Leon Miedema || SUPERKOMBAT World Grand Prix IV 2011 || Piatra Neamț, Romania || Decision (unanimous) || 3 || 31-3
|-  style="background:#fbb;"
| 2011-07-16 || Loss ||align=left| Hakan Aksoy || SUPERKOMBAT World Grand Prix II 2011 || Constanța, Romania || TKO (leg injury) || 2 || 30-3
|-  style="background:#cfc;"
| 2011-05-21 || Win ||align=left| Pacôme Assi || SUPERKOMBAT World Grand Prix I 2011 || Bucharest, Romania || TKO (corner stoppage) || 3 || 30-2
|-
! style=background:white colspan=9 |
|-  style="background:#cfc;"
| 2011-03-18 || Win ||align=left| Lelio Ramunni || WAKO-PRO World Grand Prix 2011: Romania vs. Italy || Râmnicu Vâlcea, Romania || Decision (unanimous) || 3 || 29-2
|-  style="background:#cfc;"
| 2011-02-18 || Win ||align=left| Fred Sikking || Real Pain Challenge: Rising Force || Sofia, Bulgaria || KO (right hook) || 1 || 28-2
|-  style="background:#cfc;"
| 2010-11-20 || Win ||align=left| Dženan Poturak || Local Kombat: "10 ani în RING" || Sibiu, Romania || KO (right hook) || 2 || 27-2
|-  style="background:#cfc;"
| 2010-10-15 || Win ||align=left| Vasile Popovici || RFC Slobozia || Slobozia, Romania || Decision || 3 || 26-2
|-  style="background:#cfc;"
| 2010-07-24 || Win ||align=left| Sebastian Horeica || Selecţie Local Kombat || Constanța, Romania || TKO (doctor stoppage) || 3 || 25-2
|-
! style=background:white colspan=9 |
|-  style="background:#cfc;"
| 2010-07-24 || Win ||align=left| Viorel Butnaru || Selecţie Local Kombat || Constanța, Romania || Decision || 4 || 24-2
|-  style="background:#fbb;"
| 2010-06-05 || Loss ||align=left| Sebastian Horeica || RFC Craiova || Craiova, Romania || Decision || 3 || 23-2
|-  style="background:#cfc;"
| 2010-05-13 || Win ||align=left| Sebastian Horeica || Local Kombat: "Se caută un greu" || Sibiu, Romania || TKO (doctor stoppage) || 1 || 23-1
|-  style="background:#cfc;"
| 2009-12-18 || Win ||align=left| Sorin Radu || Klash "Noua Generație" || Sibiu, Romania || TKO (corner stoppage) || 2 || 22-1
|-  style="background:#cfc;"
| 2009-07-10 || Win ||align=left| Daniel Lazăr || Full Fight XVII || Râmnicu Vâlcea, Romania || KO (knee to the head) || 3 || 21-1
|-
! style=background:white colspan=9 |
|-  style="background:#cfc;"
| 2009-06-05 || Win ||align=left| Boris Vadim Grîu || Full Fight XV, Finals || Timișoara, Romania || Decision || 3 || 20-1
|-  style="background:#cfc;"
| 2009-06-05 || Win ||align=left| Nicolae Nuțu || Full Fight XV, Semi Finals || Timișoara, Romania || KO (spinning back kick) || 2 || 19-1
|-
| colspan=9 | Legend:

Professional boxing record

Personal life 
He is married and has two daughters, Francesca Antonia (b. 2016) and Yasmina Maria (b. 2019).

See also 
List of male kickboxers

References

1990 births
Living people
Sportspeople from Bucharest
Eastern Orthodox Christians from Romania
Romanian male kickboxers
Light heavyweight kickboxers
Cruiserweight kickboxers
Romanian sanshou practitioners
Romanian male boxers
Heavyweight boxers
Glory kickboxers
SUPERKOMBAT kickboxers
ONE Championship kickboxers